Virolahti is the southeasternmost municipality of Finland on the border of Russia. It is located in the Kymenlaakso region.

The municipality is unilingually Finnish.

The Vaalimaa border crossing, which connects the municipality with Russia, is located in Virolahti.

History
Virolahti is named after Estonians from Virumaa who traded around the nearby bay, which is also called Virolahti. The first mention of Virolahti dates to 1336. It is mentioned as an independent parish in 1370.

A small part of Virolahti was ceded by Sweden to Russia in the Treaty of Uusikaupunki in 1721. The border was located slightly further west than the modern Finnish-Russian border. In the treaty of Turku of 1743, the rest of Virolahti was ceded to Russia. The northern part of Virolahti became the Miehikkälä parish in 1863.

Before World War I the Russian Emperor Nicholas II used to spend summers with his family in the archipelago of Virolahti with his yacht Standart, Finland being an autonomous province within the Russian Empire between 1809 and 1917.

Virolahti lost some of its area (over ) to Soviet Union in Paris Peace Treaties, 1947, after World War II.

Villages in 1939
Villages marked with an asterisk (*) are now completely or partially on the Russian side:

Alapihlaja, Alaurpala*, Eerikkälä, Hailila, Hanski, Hellä (Heligby), Hämeenkylä (Tavastby), Häppilä, Järvenkylä, Kattilainen, Kiiskilahti* (now Kiyskinlakhti), Kirkonkylä, Klamila, Koivuniemi, Koskela*, Koskelanjoki, Kotola, Kurkela, Laitsalmi*, Länsikylä (Flonckarböle), Martinsaari* (Now Island of Maly Pogranichny), Mattila, Mustamaa, Nopala, Orslahti* (now Primorskoye), Paatio* (Båtö in Swedish, now Bolshoy Pogranitshny), Pajulahti, Pajusaari*, Pitkäpaasi* (Island of Gorniya Kamenya), Pyterlahti, Ravijoki, Ravijärvi, Reinikkala, Rännänen (Grennäs), Sydänkylä (Kallfjärd), Säkäjärvi, Tiilikkala, Vaalimaa (Vaderma), Vilkkilä, Virojoki, Yläpihlaja, Yläurpala* (now Torfjanovka).

Notable people born in Virolahti
Uuno Klami, composer
Johannes Takanen, sculptor
Aarne Sihvo, general
Veli Saarinen, cross-country skier, olympic gold medalist
Väinö Liikkanen, cross-country skier, olympic silver medalist

References

External links

Municipality of Virolahti – Official website 
Map of Virolahti

Municipalities of Kymenlaakso